Inner Holm is a small inhabited island in Stromness harbour and one of the Orkney islands of Scotland.

The larger islet of Outer Holm, to which Inner Holm is also connected at low tide,  lies to the south. The waters of Cairston Roads, part of Scapa Flow, lie to the east.

Although not recorded as permanently inhabited in 2001 according to the 2011 census  there was a single inhabitant both at that time and in 2001 when the total for the islet was included with that of Orkney itself. A small wind turbine has been erected on the west coast.

The SS Gnome ran aground on 23 January 1857  while entering Stromness harbour "on the Holme side". It is thought she was  successfully recovered from a position between the Inner and Outer Holm.

Notes

Islands of the Orkney Islands
Tidal islands of Scotland